Goran Vuk (born 11 October 1987) is a Slovenian football forward who plays for Kamnik.

Personal life
His younger brother, Slobodan Vuk, is also a professional footballer.

References

External links
NZS profile 

1987 births
Living people
People from Jajce
Slovenian footballers
Association football forwards
NK Dob players
NK Domžale players
NK Radomlje players
Slovenian PrvaLiga players
Slovenian Second League players
Slovenian expatriate footballers
Slovenian expatriate sportspeople in Austria
Expatriate footballers in Austria